Health Technology Assessment is a weekly peer-reviewed open access medical journal published by the National Institute for Health and Care Research (NIHR), a research partner of the United Kingdom National Health Service. It publishes research on the evaluations of health technologies, their effectiveness, cost and broader impact. The journal was established in 1997 and the editor-in-chief is John Powell (NIHR). According to the Journal Citation Reports, the journal has a 2015 impact factor of 4.058. The journal, along with four others, is part of the NIHR Journals Library.

References

External links 
 

Publications established in 1997
Weekly journals
Healthcare journals
National Institute for Health and Care Research
Open access journals
English-language journals
Academic journals published by governments